Diana Soberano Manlosa-Tiongson (born November 18, 1981), professionally known as Dianne dela Fuente, is a Filipino actress and singer.

Life and career
Dianne dela Fuente was born Diana Soberano Manlosa to parents Celia and Filemon. She has four siblings: Ronan, Sonia, Filemon III and Marlo.

Dianne dela Fuente made her television debut, as a series regular, on the now-defunct children's gag-variety show Ang TV.

She was cast as Maria Amor in the ABS-CBN drama series Pangako Sa 'Yo in 2000 and Mithi on the edutainment Pahina.

In 2001, she played Minerva on Sa Dulo Ng Walang Hanggan and also made her debut as a VJ on Knowledge Channel's historical educational program Kasaysayan TV.

dela Fuente sang theme song of the 2002 Star Cinema film Got 2 Believe and reprised her role in Pahina, which was renewed after its cancellation in 2001. She was included in the Gawad KKK-Galing ng Kabataan "10 Most Outstanding Youth of the Philippines". She also received the Parangal ng Bayan "Most Promising Performer" award in the same year.

After a year, she graduated with a degree in communication arts from the Angelicum College.

She played the lead role in the TRUMPETS stage production of The Little Mermaid in 2006, her co-stars were KC Concepcion, and Carol Banawa. She also played the character Bising in MUSICAT's Alikabok.

She tried being a news anchor for CLTV 36.

She was back as an actress via False Positive in GMA Network starring Xian Lim and Glaiza de Castro.

In 2023, she plays the role of Dra. Patricia Minor as the neurosurgery department chief resident in the GMA Network medical drama Abot-Kamay na Pangarap.

Filmography

References

External links

Star Magic
Viva Artists Agency
Living people
People from Pampanga
ABS-CBN personalities
Star Music
Star Music artists
21st-century Filipino women singers
1981 births